John Cairney  (8 October 1898 – 5 August 1966) was a New Zealand anatomist, medical superintendent and writer. He was born in Greymouth, New Zealand, on 8 October 1898.

In 1953, Cairney was awarded the Queen Elizabeth II Coronation Medal. In the 1960 New Year Honours, he was appointed a Companion of the Order of St Michael and St George.

References

1898 births
1966 deaths
New Zealand writers
New Zealand surgeons
New Zealand hospital administrators
20th-century surgeons
New Zealand Companions of the Order of St Michael and St George
People from Greymouth